Ralph Hammeras (March 24, 1894 – February 3, 1970) was an American special effects designer, cinematographer and art director. He was nominated for three Academy Awards. He created a large-scale miniature of the city of London for the film The Sky Hawk, he also created special mechanical effects for it. He was born in Minneapolis, Minnesota, and died in Los Angeles, California.

Awards 
 1929: Nominated for an Academy Award for Best Engineering Effects.
 1931: Just Imagine - Nominated for an Academy Award for Best Art Direction.
 1949: Deep Waters - Nominated for an Academy Award for Best Special Effects.

References

External links

1894 births
1970 deaths
Special effects people
American cinematographers
American art directors
Artists from Minneapolis